The 2001 World Games were held in Akita, Japan, from August 16 to August 26, 2001.

Acrobatic gymnastics

Aerobic gymnastics

Artistic roller skating

Bodybuilding

Boules sports

Bowling

Casting

Cue sports

Dancesport

Field archery

Finswimming

Fistball

Flying disc

Inline speed skating

Ju-jitsu

Karate

Korfball

Lifesaving

Orienteering

Parachuting

Powerlifting

Rhythmic gymnastics

Roller hockey

Rugby sevens

Trampoline gymnastics

Tug of war

Water skiing

Invitational sports

Beach handball

Gateball

Sumo

Tug of war

References

External links
 Official website
 International World Games Association

Medalists
2001